Diekholzen is a village and a municipality in the district of Hildesheim, in Lower Saxony, Germany. It is situated approximately 6 km southwest of Hildesheim on the Beuster, a tributary of the Innerste.

History 
In 1974, the former villages of Diekholzen, Söhre, Barienrode and Egenstedt were united to form the municipality of Diekholzen. Each village has its own history and various sights. Most of the inhabitants are Roman Catholics. The largest village of the municipality is Diekholzen with an administration building, a school, a hospital, several shops, a supermarket, some restaurants and a hotel. Several times a day, each village of the municipality is accessible from Hildesheim and from Alfeld by bus.

Personalities 
 Johann Friedrich Ruthe (1788-1859), lecturer, botanist and entomologist; born in the district of Egenstedt
 Karl Hoppe (1923-1987), motorcycle racing driver

Gallery

References 

Hildesheim (district)